Alberto Andrés Marcovecchio (March 6, 1893 – February 28, 1958) was an Argentine football player that spent all his career at Racing Club de Avellaneda. His position on the field was forward, converting more than 200 goals during his career.

Only in Primera División, Marcovecchio scored 118 between 1913 and 1922.

Playing style 
As a forward, Marchovecchio was regarded for his capacity to be placed just in time to score a goal. He often scored more than a goal per game, having been the topscorer during the 1917 and 1919 Primera División seasons. He was part of the outstanding Racing Club squad that won 9 titles between 1913 and 1921, 7 of them consecutively.

Career 
After playing for a minor team of his neighborhood (El Porteño), Marcovecchio started his youth career at Racing in 1909. Three years later he was promoted to the Primera División. During his first season in the top level, he scored 7 goals. Along with great player Alberto Ohaco Marcovecchio became the topscorer of the team that won 7 consecutive championships between 1913 and 1919.

In 1917 Marchovecchio was the topscorer of the season with 18 goals in 20 games played. In 1921 he won his last title with Racing Club before leaving football due to an injury.

With the Argentina national team Marcovecchio played only 11 games, making his debut in December 1912 v Uruguay. In 1916 he was called up for the 1916 South American Championship and debuted against Chile scoring 2 goals. His international career ended in 1919 when he played the Newton and Lipton Cups for the national side.

Honours

Club
Racing 
 Primera División (8): 1913, 1914, 1915, 1916, 1917, 1918, 1919, 1921
 Copa Honor MCBA (3): 1913, 1915, 1917 
 Copa Ibarguren (5): 1913, 1914, 1916, 1917, 1918
 Copa de Honor Cousenier (1): 1913
 Copa Aldao (2): 1917, 1918

Individual
 Primera División Top scorer: 1917, 1919

Notes

References

1893 births
1958 deaths
Argentine footballers
Argentina international footballers
Association football forwards
Argentine Primera División players
Racing Club de Avellaneda footballers
Sportspeople from Avellaneda